Swabi is a city in Khyber Pakhtunkhwa province of Pakistan, located near the banks of the Indus River. It is the 73rd largest city of Pakistan and eighth largest in the province of Khyber Pakhtunkhwa. Swabi is also a key city in Mardan Division, where it is the second-largest city.

Demographics

According to the 2017 Census of Pakistan, the city of Swabi had 123,412 inhabitants, making it the eighth-largest city in Khyber Pakhtunkhwa. These inhabitants were spread out among 16,212 households, making the average household size in Swabi 7.61. Swabi experienced quick growth throughout the latter half of the twentieth century, as the population of Swabi grew nearly fivefold in just 40 years. The city's growth has, though, over time, slowed down, and between the years of 1998 and 2017, its population only grew at a rate of 2.29% every year.

Climate 
Swabi has a warm and temperate climate. With hot, humid summers and mild winters, Swabi features a humid subtropical climate (Köppen Cwa). The average temperature in Swabi is 22.2 °C, while the annual precipitation averages 639 mm. November is the driest month with an average rainfall of 12 mm, while the wettest month is August, with an average 137 mm of precipitation.

June is the hottest month of the year with an average temperature of 32.9 °C. The coldest month is January with an average temperature of 10.2 °C.

Education
Following are some of the notable educational institutes in Swabi:
Ghulam Ishaq Khan Institute of Engineering Sciences and Technology
University of Swabi
Gajju Khan Medical College
Women University Swabi
Government Post Graduate College

See also 

 List of cities in Khyber Pakhtunkhwa by population
 Mardan Division
 Swabi District
 Swabi Tehsil
 Topi
 Zarobi Tehsil Topi
 Tordher
 Zaida

References

External links
 University of Swabi

Populated places in Swabi District
Union Councils of Swabi District
Swabi District
Cities in Khyber Pakhtunkhwa